Daniel Kressner (born 7 April 1978) is a German numerical analyst. He has a Chair of Numerical Algorithms and High Performance Computing in the Institute of Mathematics at EPF Lausanne.

Education and career
Kressner was born in Karl-Marx-Stadt. He studied Mathematics at TU Chemnitz from 1997 to 2001 and gained his PhD from TU Berlin in 2004. His PhD thesis ("Numerical Methods and Software for General and Structured Eigenvalue
Problems") was supervised by Volker Mehrmann. He was appointed assistant professor in Applied Mathematics at ETH Zurich in 2007. In 2011 he was appointed tenure-track assistant professor in Mathematics at EPF Lausanne, where he became associate professor in 2012 and full professor in 2017. Kressner held visiting positions as an Emmy Noether Fellow of the DFG at the University of Zagreb in 2005 and Umeå University in 2006. In 2018 he was the John von Neumann visiting professor at TU Munich.

Kressner has been the Editor-in-Chief of ACM Transactions on Mathematical Software in 2017, and he is on the editorial boards of journals including the SIAM Journal on Matrix Analysis and its Applications, SIAM Journal on Numerical Analysis, and Linear Algebra and Its Applications.

Research
Kressner is best known for his work on numerical methods, in particular for linear eigenvalue problems, nonlinear eigenvalue problems, and low-rank approximation techniques for matrix problems.

Recognition
He has been awarded a second Leslie Fox Prize for Numerical Analysis from the Institute of Mathematics and its Applications in 2007. In 2011 he received the John Todd Award from the Mathematical Research Institute of Oberwolfach.

He was elected as a Fellow of the Society for Industrial and Applied Mathematics, in the 2022 Class of SIAM Fellows, "for contributions in numerical linear and multilinear algebra and scientific computing".

Selected publications

References

External links
 Homepage

1978 births
Living people
Numerical analysts
Academic staff of the École Polytechnique Fédérale de Lausanne
Chemnitz University of Technology alumni
People from Chemnitz
Academic staff of ETH Zurich
Technical University of Berlin alumni
Mathematics journal editors
German expatriates in Switzerland
21st-century German mathematicians
Fellows of the Society for Industrial and Applied Mathematics